A list of the tallest mosques in the world. The height value gives the height of the tallest element of the mosque (usually a minaret).

List

See also
 List of tallest minarets

References 

 
Mosques